The Glen-class tug is a class of naval tugboat operated by the Royal Canadian Navy. Constructed in Canada, the class entered service between 1975 and 1977. The five vessels that comprise the class are split between the two major naval bases of the Royal Canadian Navy. The vessels of the current Glen class are each named after one of the vessels of the earlier class.

Description
The Glen class is a series of five yard tractor tugboats designed for coastal/harbour use in Canada's major naval bases. They initially had a complement of six officers and ratings.

Ships
The five vessels are divided between the two fleets of the Royal Canadian Navy, with three assigned to Maritime Forces Atlantic, based at CFB Halifax and two assigned to Maritime Forces Pacific, homeported at CFB Esquimalt.

The crews of the fireboats are cross-trained and able to crew a Glen-class vessel in emergencies. However, Firebird on the east coast was taken out of service and prepared for disposal.

Replacements
On 4 December 2012 the Department of National Defence published an enquiry for Canadian shipbuilders interested in building replacements for the Glen-class tugs¸and Fire-class fireboats. A single class would replace both the tugs and the fireboats, and would be operated by civilian crews. The replacement vessels would have water cannons that could be controlled remotely, by a single individual. The replacement vessels would have bollard pull of 40 tons. Since their intended role would be harbour duties, they would have limited range and crew berthing capacity.

On 29 April 2019 the Government of Canada announced Ocean Industries of Isle-aux-Coudres, Quebec was awarded the contract to build four tow-tug / rescue vessels to replace both the Fire-class fireboat/tractor tugs and Glen-class yard tugs with delivery expected from 2021 to 2023.

See also

References

References

External links
 

Auxiliary tugboat classes
 
Tugboats of the Royal Canadian Navy